The Sherif Halil Pasha Mosque,, more commonly known as the Tombul (or Tumbul) Mosque, located in Shumen, is the largest mosque in Bulgaria and one of the largest in the Balkans.

History
Build between 1740 and 1744, the mosque was initially located in the north-eastern Bulgarian (then Ottoman) town's centre, but is now in Shumen's south-west parts as the town centre moved as a result of the enlargement of the town. The mosque's name comes from the shape of its dome.

The mosque and the associated buildings is the largest in Bulgaria. The Tombul Mosque is considered to be a cultural monument of national importance.

The building of the mosque was financed by Sheriff Halil Pasha who was born in the village of Madara, 17 km east of Shumen.

The mosque's complex consists of a main edifice (a prayer hall), a yard and a twelve-room extension (a boarding house of the madrasa). The main edifice is in its fundamental part a square, then becomes an octagon passing to a circle in the middle part, and is topped by a spherical dome that is 25 m above ground. The interior has mural paintings of vegetable life and geometric figures and inscriptions of Arabic, phrases from the Qur'an. The yard is known for the arches in front of the twelve rooms that surround it and the minaret is 40 m high.

See also
 Islam in Bulgaria

References 

Ottoman mosques in Bulgaria
Mosque buildings with domes
Tourist attractions in Shumen Province
Buildings and structures in Shumen
Culture in Shumen
18th-century mosques
1744 establishments in the Ottoman Empire
Mosques completed in 1744